Lakshman Tikiri Bandara Dehideniya is a Sri Lanka Judge. He is a Puisne Justice of the Supreme Court of Sri Lanka and former President of the Court of Appeal of Sri Lanka.

References

Living people
Sinhalese judges
Puisne Justices of the Supreme Court of Sri Lanka
Year of birth missing (living people)
Place of birth missing (living people)